Catherine Kernan (born 1948) is an American artist. Her work is included in the collections of the Smithsonian American Art Museum, the Detroit Institute of Arts, the Museum of Fine Arts, Boston and the Cleveland Museum of Art.

References

Living people
1948 births
Artists from New York (state)
20th-century American women artists
21st-century American women artists